Countrycore is the combining of hardcore punk and heavy metal influences with country and country rock influences. Matanza from Rio de Janeiro has been described as the first countrycore act. Later, bands such as Belmont and their single "Country Girl" have been described as countrycore.

History

Cowpunk: Late 1970s–1980s

The first instance of a country music and punk rock fusion took place in the late-1970s. This led to the creation of what is now known as cowpunk, which combined country with punk rock or new wave music.

As the 1980s progressed, cowpunk began to wane and many of the musicians in the genre later became associated with the alternative country, roots rock, or Americana genres.

Countrycore: Late 1990s–present 
The second instance of a country and punk fusion took place in the late 1990s and involved hardcore punk and heavy metal. Matanza has been described as being the earliest known countrycore band, having formed in 1996. Later, in 2014, pop punk band Belmont would form and would at times have songs, especially "Country Girl", labeled as countrycore.

The name for this genre was not coined until 2007 when Mike Milo on College Humor was quoted as saying:

Throw up your devil horns and rock out to some country-core!

References

20th-century music genres
Country music
Country music genres
Hardcore punk
Hardcore punk genres
Heavy metal music
Heavy metal genres